A handlebar is part of the steering mechanism, in lieu of a steering wheel, for vehicles that are ridden on, such as:

 Bicycle handlebar
 Motorcycle handlebar

Handlebar may also refer to

 Handlebar moustache, a type of moustache
 Handlebar, a restaurant in the fourth season of the American TV series Kitchen Nightmares
 Handlebars (template system), a Javascript library to build semantic templates
 "Handlebars" (song), a song by the Flobots